Eric Cuthbert Christmas (19 March 1916 – 22 July 2000) was a British actor, with over 40 films and numerous television roles to his credit. He is probably best known for his role as Mr. Carter, the principal of Angel Beach High School, in the 1981 comedy films Porky's, the 1983 sequel Porky's II: The Next Day, and the 1985 sequel Porky's Revenge!. He was also known for his sporadic role as Reverend Diddymoe in the NBC sitcom, Amen.

Life and career
Christmas was born in London, England, and later emigrated to Canada. His role as a priest in the 1971 film Harold and Maude includes a memorable monologue to an off-camera Harold, in which he discusses, with increasing nausea and disgust, how the thought of Harold's sexual affair with a much older woman "makes [him] want...to vomit." His also had film roles in Monte Walsh (1970), The Andromeda Strain (1971), Johnny Got His Gun (1971), The Last Tycoon (1976), An Enemy of the People (1978), Attack of the Killer Tomatoes (1978), The Changeling (1980), Middle Age Crazy (1980), The Philadelphia Experiment (1984), and All of Me (1984). He also appeared in the episode, "When I'm 64", in the TV series "ALF as Bernie, one of the residents of a retirement home, Bugsy (1991), Almost Dead (1994), Air Bud (1997), and his final feature film Mouse Hunt (1997).

Christmas also made guest appearances on many television shows, including Columbo (as a sardonic Jeweler in "A Friend in Deed"), Adventures in Rainbow Country, Due South, ER, Misfits of Science, Night Court, The Fresh Prince of Bel-Air, Wiseguy (as Harry "The Hunch" Shanstra), Seinfeld (as Jeffrey Harharwood in "The Gum"—Episode 120, first airing on 14 December 1995), Cheers (season 7; episode 2), Home Improvement (as Sir Larry the Magician), Coach (as Brian Currie), The Golden Palace, The X-Files, Booker, Matlock, Walker Texas Ranger, Roseanne, L.A. Law (as Buzz Carr),  Major Dad, and Ally McBeal. And a appearance on "Amen".  From 1995-96 he played Father Francis on Days of Our Lives, a key role in the infamous possession of Marlena Evans. He went to San Diego to teach and to revive the La Jolla Playhouse, for which he directed The Man Who Came to Dinner in temporary space at La Jolla High School, with equity actor Larry Seaman in the lead role, and also starring Robert Zimmerman (BHP-San Francisco Faculty) as the reporter and James Pearson as Banjo (Harpo Marx role).  Christmas also acted in and directed productions of San Diego, California's Old Globe Theatre's Shakespeare Festivals for many years. In 1983 Christmas played and sang the role of "Jack Point" in the San Diego Gilbert and Sullivan Repertory Company's production of "The Yoemen of the Guard."

During the 1970s and 1980s, Christmas was a drama professor at the University of California, San Diego, and made theatrical presentations at local high schools, including La Jolla Country Day School.

Death
He died on 22 July 2000, from natural causes at the age of 84. He was interred at the Santa Barbara Cemetery at Santa Barbara, California.

Filmography

Bonanza (1969, Episode: "Dead Wrong") .... Bobby Dan
Monte Walsh (1970) .... Colonel Wilson
The Andromeda Strain (1971) .... Senator from Vermont
Johnny Got His Gun (1971) .... Corporal Timlon
"The Men From Shiloh" (rebranded name of The Virginian 1971, TV series) .... Parker
Harold and Maude (1971) .... Priest
Columbo (1974, Episode: "A Friend in Deed") .... Bruno Wexler
The Last Tycoon (1976) .... Norman
Code Name: Diamond Head (1977) .... Father Murphy
An Enemy of the People (1978) .... Morten Kiil
Attack of the Killer Tomatoes (1978) .... Senator Polk
The Changeling (1980) .... Albert Harmon
Middle Age Crazy (1980) .... Tommy
Porky's (1981) .... Mr. Carter
Porky's II: The Next Day (1983) .... Mr. Carter
The Philadelphia Experiment (1984) .... Dr. James Longstreet
All of Me (1984) .... Fred Hoskins
Porky's Revenge! (1985) .... Mr. Carter
Happy Hour (1986) .... Harry The Guard
Home Is Where the Hart Is (1987) .... Martin Hart
Cheers (1988, TV series) .... Father Barry
Amen (1989) .... Reverend Diddymoe 
Night Court (TV series) (Jan. 17, 1990) Night Court (Razing Bull) ....Pops Durkin 
Whispers (1990) .... Joshua Rinehart
Bugsy (1991) .... Ronald the Butler
Home Improvement (Oct. 1, 1991) .... Sir Larry Houdini
Dead in the Water (1991) .... Judge Griffin
Ed and His Dead Mother (1993) .... Mr. Abner
Naked Gun : The Final Insult (1994) .... Prison Chaplain (scenes deleted)
Almost Dead (1994) .... Father Ambrose
The X-Files (1994) .... Stan
Seinfeld (1995, TV series) .... Geoffrey Haarwood
Air Bud (1997) .... Judge Cranfield
Mouse Hunt (1997) .... Ernie and Lars' Lawyer

References

External links
 
 
 
 
 

1916 births
2000 deaths
English male film actors
English male stage actors
British expatriate male actors in the United States
English emigrants to Canada
20th-century English male actors
Male actors from London
University of California, San Diego faculty
Burials at Santa Barbara Cemetery